Oblación is a 1994 album by Venezuelan musician Alberto Naranjo.

Personnel
 Alberto Naranjo – arrangements, direction, drums, percussion
 Víctor Mestas – acoustic piano
 Gustavo Carucí – electric bass
 Julio Flores – soprano, alto and baritone saxophones
 Rodolfo Reyes – alto and tenor saxophones, flute
 Oscar Mendoza – trombone
 Alexander Livinalli – percussion
 Vladimir Quintero – percussion

Special guests
 Rafael Velásquez  (trumpet on 4, 6, 8)
 José Ortiz (piano on 6)
 Huguette Contramaestre (lead vocalist on 6, 7, 12)
 Fusión IV: Ilba Rojas, Adriana Portales, Kodiak Agüero and José Mena (vocal group on 12)

Track listing

All songs composed and arranged by Alberto Naranjo, except:
Desesperanza, composed by María Luisa Escobar and arranged by Naranjo
  Mood Indigo, composed by Duke Ellington, Irving Mills and Barney Bigard andarranged by Naranjo; Johnny Hodges' original solo orchestrated by Naranjo
 Blues and the Abstract Truth, composed and arranged by Oliver Nelson andorchestrated by Naranjo
 María (a), composed by Leonardo Silva Beauregard and orchestrated by Naranjo

Other credits
 Recorded and mixed by Agustín [Augie] Verde at Estudios Intersonido in Caracas, Venezuela
 Date of recording: August 1994
 Musical producer: Alberto Naranjo
 Executive producers: Roberto Obeso and Federico Pacanins
 Graphic design/Illustrations: Luisa F. Almeida/Ernesto León
 Cover photo: Luis Salmerón

External links
Barna-L'Ostia Latin Jazz.com
Salsa 2-U.com
 Sincopa.com
Top 100 Latin Jazz Recordings of All Time (#97)

1994 albums
Alberto Naranjo albums
Latin jazz albums by Venezuelan artists